Where's Raymond? is an American sitcom that aired on ABC, starring Ray Bolger. The series aired from October 1953 to April 22, 1955. The series' title was spurred by Bolger's Broadway stage hit Where's Charley?.

In the 1954–1955 season, the series was renamed The Ray Bolger Show.

Synopsis
Bolger stars as Raymond Wallace, a song-and-dance man who is consistently barely on time for his performances.  Bolger's co-stars in both seasons were Richard Erdman as Pete Morrisey, Ray's landlord and press agent and Sylvia Lewis as Sylvia, Ray's dancing partner and the series choreographer. Allyn Joslyn appeared as Jonathan Wallace, Ray's brother. Betty Lynn played Jonathan's wife June, and Frances Karath played their daughter Ginny.

In the second season, Marjie Millar played Susan, Ray's girlfriend and an aspiring writer from Iowa, and Christine Nelson portrayed Katie Jones, Susan's friend.

Guest stars
 Elinor Donahue 
 King Donovan
 Steve Reeves
 Irene Ryan
 William Schallert

Production notes
The series was filmed by Desilu at General Service Studios in Hollywood. Where's Raymond? aired at 8:30 EST on Thursdays opposite Four Star Playhouse, an anthology series on CBS, Broadway to Hollywood on DuMont (first season) and Treasury Men in Action on NBC.

Reception
A review of Where's Raymond? in TV Guide said that the program had "a thin story line on which to base a 39-week series". It added, however, that Bolger's dancing, humor, and singing "should be enough to please most viewers".

References

External links
 
 Public domain episode at Internet Archive, "as originally broadcast"

1953 American television series debuts
1955 American television series endings
1950s American sitcoms
American Broadcasting Company original programming
Black-and-white American television shows
English-language television shows
Television shows set in Los Angeles
Television series by CBS Studios